William C Speidel (1912–1988) was a columnist for The Seattle Times and a self-made historian who wrote the books Sons of the Profits and Doc Maynard, The Man Who Invented Seattle about the people who settled and built Seattle, Washington.

Speidel is also credited with being one of the leaders of the movement to preserve and restore Pioneer Square, one of Seattle's oldest neighborhoods. By the 1960s, this area was run down and in disrepair, in danger of being demolished and rebuilt. Through the efforts of many people, Pioneer Square is once again a bustling center of activity and tourism with dozens of original buildings that have been restored to their original luster.

In 1964, Speidel received and printed a letter from a reader asking about the underground areas of Pioneer Square.  He replied via the paper that he did not know much about it, but that he would research it and get back to her. Once he did the research, he printed a response telling her to meet him at 3 p.m. the next Saturday in Pioneer Square, and he would take her on a tour of the underground and what he had found.

The reader did show up, along with 500 other people. Speidel quickly took up a collection of $1 from each of the visitors and proceeded on the first tour of the Seattle Underground. Since Memorial Day weekend 1965, the Underground Tour has given several tours a day every day except holidays and is one of the city's best known tourist attractions.

As a Seattle historian, Speidel was something of a revisionist and the narration of the Underground Tour reflects that. Doc Maynard, whom Speidel called "The Man Who Invented Seattle", was given short shrift in what Speidel characterized as the "Party Line" on the city's history, in part because the longer-lived Arthur Denny was so influential on the writing of that history. Jacob Furth, whom Speidel wrote "may even have been the most important citizen Seattle ever had" was highly lauded at the time of his death in 1914, but later became, in Speidel's words, "a neglected giant", with "scant mention in our history books" and "no streets, statues, parks or public buildings to honor him." Speidel also made claims for brothel-owner Lou Graham as a key figure in the growth of the city.

Bibliography
 
Speidel, William (1957). Be My Guest! In The Pacific Northwest. Vashon Island, WA: Nettle Creek.

Notes

1912 births
1988 deaths
American columnists
Writers from Seattle
20th-century American non-fiction writers